Unicorns is a folk album by Bill Caddick recorded and released in 2002.

Recorded and produced by Mick Dolan. Issued by Working Joe Music in the UK, catalogue number WJM2003.

These are 2002 rerecordings of Caddick's "greatest hits" (the original albums being unavailable) plus a few previously unrecorded songs.

Track listing 
All written by Bill Caddick except where noted.

Disc 1 
Donkey Jack
Waiting For The Lark
Oller Boller
Winter Fair
Poor Pig
Narrow Lock Gates
King Sun
Unicorns
John O'Dreams
Jack Pudding
One Hand On The Radio (Bond/Caddick)
Born A Dog
Rainbow Waistcoat
Letter To Syracuse (Caddick/Cartwright)
Sunny Memories
Gibson Girl
The Reaper
The Writing Of Tipperary

Disc 2 
Eights And Aces
Wild West Show
Two-Fisted Heroes
The Day They Busted Superman
Spanish Nights
A Dance To The Music Of Time
Stay On The Line
Chaconne
Won't Say When
Lili Marlene Walks Away
The Barmaid's Song (She Moves Among Men)
Down In The South
Can't Blame A Man
Reach For Jesus
Flat Earth
Aqaba
Quixote (The Old Man's Song) (Caddick/Tams)
The Last Damn Song

Personnel 
Bill Caddick - guitar, vocals

References

Bill Caddick albums
2002 albums